Keijo Vanhala (7 July 1940 – 5 June 2003) was a Finnish modern pentathlete. He competed at the 1964 Summer Olympics.

References

1940 births
2003 deaths
Finnish male modern pentathletes
Olympic modern pentathletes of Finland
Modern pentathletes at the 1964 Summer Olympics
Sportspeople from Helsinki